The Iran national cricket team is a cricket team representing Iran in international cricket. They became an affiliate member of the International Cricket Council (ICC) in 2003 and an associate member in 2017.

History 
Cricket was introduced in Iran in the 1920s and 1930s by the British who were working in the oil industry but it ceased when the oil industry was nationalised in 1951. Cricket was reintroduced in the early 1990s by Iranians who had studied abroad. Iran joined the Asian Cricket Council in 2003. Iran's men's cricket league was established in 2014 with eight teams as participants and Chah Bahar became the first winners. In the same year women's cricket league was also established which was won by Mashhad.

Following their admission to the International Cricket Council, they made their international debut at the 2004 ACC Trophy, and played in the tournament again in the 2006 tournament. On both occasions, they failed to progress beyond the first round. With the separation of the ACC Trophy into Elite and Challenge divisions, following their performance at the 2006 ACC Trophy Iran have since competed in the Challenge divisions in both 2009 and in the 2010 competition, coming 5th in both.

2018-Present
In April 2018, the ICC decided to grant full Twenty20 International (T20I) status to all its members. Therefore, all Twenty20 matches played between Iran and other ICC members after 1 January 2019 will be a full T20I.

Iran played their first T20I against UAE on 23 February 2020 during the 2020 ACC Western Region T20.

Team colours
Iran's kits vary from year to year; the team have worn kits in green color, at times red kits and also grey kits.
The kits always have 'Iran' written on the front of the jersey; usually Iran's cricket logo and at times sponsor logos also appear.

Tournament history

Asia Cup Qualifier 
2018: Did not participate
2020: Did not qualify

ACC Western Region T20
 2019: Did not play
 2020: Group stage

ACC Trophy

ACC Middle East Cup

Head coaches

 Hossein Ali Salimian (c.2004)
 Shahid Aslam (c.2006)
 Nariman Bakhtiar
 Armond Nahabedian (c.2009)
 Mahmood Rashid Dar 2011-2015

Records and Statistics 

International Match Summary — Iran
 
Last updated 25 February 2020

Twenty20 International 
 Highest team total: 108/8 v Kuwait, 25 February 2020 at Al Amerat Cricket Stadium, Muscat
 Highest individual score: 39, Yousef Shadzehisarjou v Kuwait, 25 February 2020 at Al Amerat Cricket Stadium, Muscat
 Best individual bowling figures: 1/10, Nader Zahadiafzal v Saudi Arabia, 24 February 2020 at Al Amerat Cricket Stadium, Muscat

T20I record versus other nations

Records complete to T20I #1061. Last updated 25 February 2020.

Other matches
For a list of selected international matches played by Iran, see Cricket Archive.

Other records

Limited-overs records

Highest team total: 369/6 v China, January 13, 2009 at Gymkhana Club, Chiang Mai
Lowest team total: 29 v Nepal, June 14, 2004 at Kelab Aman, Kuala Lumpur

Highest limited-overs scores for Iran

Most limited-overs runs for Iran

Best bowling figures in an innings for Iran

See also
List of Iran Twenty20 International cricketers
Iran national women's cricket team

References

External links
Iranian Cricket Association.

Cricket in Iran
National cricket teams
Cricket
Iran in international cricket